Fereydoon Fazli, (born June 22, 1971) is a former professional football player who played for Nassaji Mazandaran in Azadegan League before retiring from playing football. He usually played in the striker position. He is one of the most successful strikers in the Iran Pro League.

Club career
Fereydoon Fazli has been among the most successful strikers of the IPL in recent years. In season 2004/05, he was the league's second topscorer with 14 goals for Aboomoslem FC, along with Rasoul Khatibi from Sepahan and behind Esteghlal's Reza Enayati who was the topscorer with 20 goals.

Having moved to Esteghlal Ahvaz in 2005, he became the league's second topscorer again in season 2005/06 with 17 goals in 27 appearances, while the topscorer was also Reza Enayati with 21 goals. He continued his impressive performance in the 2006/2007 season with 29 full appearances for Esteghlal Ahvaz, scoring 13 goals. With all of his success in league game, he was never invited to Team Melli.

He joined Gostaresh Foolad F.C. in 2010 and was returned to Nassaji on the same year. On 18 November 2011, he was retired from playing football at the age of 40 due injury.

Club career statistics

 Assist Goals

References

External links
 Iran Pro League Stats

1971 births
Living people
Iranian footballers
Persian Gulf Pro League players
Azadegan League players
F.C. Aboomoslem players
Esteghlal Ahvaz players
Rah Ahan players
Saba players
Tractor S.C. players
Gostaresh Foulad F.C. players
People from Qaem Shahr
Association football forwards
Sportspeople from Mazandaran province